Zakynthos or Zante, is a city and a former municipality on the island of Zakynthos, Ionian Islands, Greece. Since the 2011 local government reform it is part of the municipality Zakynthos, of which it is a municipal unit. It is the capital of the island of Zakynthos. Apart from the official name Zakynthos, it is also called Chora (i.e. the Town), a common denomination in Greece when the name of the island itself is the same as the name of the principal town.

It is subdivided into the communities Zakynthos (pop. 9,773), Ampelokipoi (1,930), Argasi (1,266), Vasilikos (799), Gaitani (1,899) and Bochali (1,143).

Notable people 
Dionysios (16th century), patron saint of Zakynthos
Pavlos Carrer (1829–1896), composer
Ugo Foscolo (1778–1827), writer, revolutionary and poet
Andreas Kalvos (1792–1869), poet
Dionysios Solomos (1798–1857), poet

International relations

Twin towns – sister cities
Zakynthos is twinned with:
 Limassol, Cyprus
 Serravalle, San Marino
 Kiryat Bialik, Israel
 Guadalajara, Mexico

References

Populated places in Zakynthos
Greek prefectural capitals
Populated places in ancient Ionian Islands